Victor Hugo Espinoza (July 15, 1929 – April 17, 1986) was a U.S. Army veteran of the Korean War and a recipient of the Medal of Honor for his actions during the Battle of Old Baldy.

Biography
Espinoza was born in El Paso, Texas on July 15, 1929.  Orphaned at an early age, he remained in foster care until joining the military.

Espinoza's actions in the U.S. Army during the Korean War in 1952 caused him to be posthumously awarded with the Medal of Honor in 2014.

After leaving the Army, Espinoza resided in El Paso until his death on April 17, 1986.  Espinoza is buried at Fort Bliss National Cemetery. He was of Mexican American descent.

Medal of Honor
Espinoza was recognized for his actions on Aug. 1, 1952, at Chorwon, Korea.

While spearheading an attack to secure Old Baldy, Espinoza's unit was pinned down by withering fire from fortified enemy positions.  In daring succession, Espinoza single-handedly silenced a machine-gun and its crew, discovered and destroyed a covert enemy tunnel, and wiped out two bunkers. His actions inspired his unit and enabled them to secure the strong-point against great odds.

The award came through the Defense Authorization Act which called for a review of Jewish American and Hispanic American veterans from World War II, the Korean War and the Vietnam War to ensure that no prejudice was shown to those deserving the Medal of Honor.

Medal of Honor Citation
'''

Other honors and awards
Besides the Medal of Honor, Espinoza received:

References

See also
List of Korean War Medal of Honor recipients

1929 births
1986 deaths
United States Army personnel of the Korean War
Korean War recipients of the Medal of Honor
United States Army Medal of Honor recipients
United States Army soldiers
American people of Mexican descent
People from El Paso, Texas